The Straits Settlements were a group of British territories located in Southeast Asia. Originally established in 1826 as part of the territories controlled by the British East India Company, the Straits Settlements came under British Raj control in 1858 and then under direct British control as a Crown colony on 1 April 1867. In 1946, following the end of the Second World War and the Japanese occupation, the colony was dissolved as part of Britain's reorganisation of its Southeast Asian dependencies in the area.

The Straits Settlements originally consisted of the four individual settlements of Penang, Singapore, Malacca, and Dinding. Christmas Island and the Cocos Islands were added in 1886. The island of Labuan, off the coast of Borneo, was also incorporated into the colony with effect from 1 January 1907, becoming a separate settlement within it in 1912. Most of the territories now form part of Malaysia, from which Singapore separated in 1965.  The Cocos (or Keeling) Islands were transferred to Australian control in 1955. Christmas Island was transferred in 1958. Their administration was combined in 1996 to form the Australian Indian Ocean Territories.

Settlements

Penang and Province Wellesley
The first settlement was the Penang territory, in 1786. This originally comprised Penang Island, then known as the Prince of Wales Island. This was later extended to encompass an area of the mainland, which became known as Province Wellesley (now Seberang Perai). The first grant was in 1800, followed by another in 1831. Further adjustments to Province Wellesley's border were made in 1859, and with the Treaty of Pangkor in 1874.
Province Wellesley, on the mainland opposite the island of Penang, was ceded to Great Britain in 1800 by the Sultan of Kedah, on its northern and eastern border; Perak lies to the south. The boundary with Kedah was rectified by treaty with Siam (now Thailand) in 1867. It was administered by a district officer, with some assistants, answering to the resident councillor of Penang. Province Wellesley consisted, for the most part, of a fertile plain, thickly populated by Malays, and occupied in some parts by sugar-planters and others engaged in similar agricultural industries and employing Chinese and Tamil labour. About a tenth of the whole area was covered by low hills with thick jungle. Large quantities of rice were grown by the Malay inhabitants, and between October and February, there was snipe-shooting in the paddy fields. A railway from Butterworth, opposite Penang, runs into Perak, and thence via Selangor and Negri Sembilan to Malacca, with an extension via Muar under the rule of the Sultan of Johor, and through the last-named state to Johor Bahru, opposite the island of Singapore.

Singapore
Singapore became the site of a British trading post in 1819 after its founder, Stamford Raffles, successfully involved the East India Company in a dynastic struggle for the throne of Johore. Thereafter the British came to control the entire island of Singapore, which was developed into a thriving colony and port. In 1824 the Dutch conceded any rights they had to the island in the Anglo-Dutch Treaty of 1824, and from 1832, Singapore was the seat of government of the Straits Settlements.

Malacca
The Dutch colony of Malacca was ceded to the British in the Anglo-Dutch Treaty of 1824 in exchange for the British possession of Bencoolen and for British rights in Sumatra. Malacca's importance was in establishing an exclusive British zone of influence in the region, and it was overshadowed as a trading post by Penang, and later, Singapore.

Dindings
The Dindings — named after the Dinding River in present-day Manjung District — which comprised Pangkor Island, and the towns of Lumut and Sitiawan on the mainland, were ceded by Perak to the British government under the Pangkor Treaty of 1874. Hopes that its excellent natural harbour would prove to be valuable were doomed to disappointment, and the territory sparsely inhabited and altogether unimportant both politically and financially, was returned to and administered by the government of Perak in February 1935.

History and government

East India Company rule
The establishment of the Straits Settlements followed the Anglo-Dutch Treaty of 1824, by which the Malay archipelago was divided into a British zone in the north and a Dutch zone in the south. This resulted in the exchange of the British settlement of Bencoolen (on Sumatra) for the Dutch colony of Malacca and undisputed control of Singapore. The Settlements were largely Chinese in population, with a tiny but important European minority. Their capital was moved from George Town, the capital of Penang, to Singapore in 1832. Their scattered nature proved to be difficult and, after the company lost its monopoly in the china trade in 1833, expensive to administer.

During their control by the East India Company, the Settlements were used as penal settlements for Indian civilian and military prisoners, earning them the title of the "Botany Bays of India". The years 1852 and 1853 saw minor uprisings by convicts in Singapore and Penang. Upset with East India Company rule, in 1857 the European population of the Settlements sent a petition to the British Parliament asking for direct rule; but the idea was overtaken by events—the Indian Rebellion of 1857.

When a "Gagging Act" was imposed to prevent the uprising in India spreading, the Settlements' press reacted with anger, classing it as something that subverted "every principle of liberty and free discussion". As there was little or no vernacular press in the Settlements, such an act seemed irrelevant: it was rarely enforced and ended in less than a year.

Crown Colony status
On 1 April 1867 the Settlements became a British Crown colony, making the Settlements answerable directly to the Colonial Office in London instead of the government of British India based in Calcutta. Earlier, on 4 February 1867, Letters Patent had granted the Settlements a colonial constitution. This allocated much power to the Settlements' Governor, who administered the colony of the Straits Settlements with the aid of an Executive Council, composed wholly of official (i.e., ex-officio) members, and a legislative council, composed partly of official and partly of nominated members, of which the former had a narrow permanent majority. The work of administration, both in the colony and in the Federated Malay States, was carried on by means of a civil service whose members were recruited by competitive examination held annually in London.

Penang and Malacca were administered, directly under the governor, by resident councillors.

Governor's wider role
In 1886 the Cocos (Keeling) Islands (which were settled and once owned by a Scottish family named Clunies-Ross) and Christmas Island, formerly attached to Ceylon, were transferred to the care of the government of the Straits Settlements in Singapore. In 1907 the former Crown Colony of Labuan, in Borneo, which for a period was vested in the British North Borneo Company, was resumed by the British government and was vested in the governor of the Straits Settlements.

The governor was also High Commissioner for the Federated Malay States on the peninsula, for British North Borneo, the sultanate of Brunei and Sarawak in Borneo. British residents controlled the native states of Perak, Selangor, Negri Sembilan, and Pahang, but on 1 July 1896, when the federation of these states was effected, a resident-general, responsible to the (governor as) high commissioner, was placed in supreme charge of all the British protectorates in the peninsula.

Japanese invasion and dissolution
During World War II, the Japanese invaded Malaya and the Straits Settlements by landing on Kelantan on 8 December 1941. On 16 December Penang became the first Straits Settlement to fall into Japanese hands. Malacca fell on 15 January and Singapore fell on 15 February, following the Battle of Singapore. The Straits Settlements, along with the rest of the Malay Peninsula, remained under Japanese occupation until the end of the war (August 1945).

After the war, the colony was dissolved with effect from 1 April 1946, with Singapore becoming a separate Crown colony (and ultimately an independent republic), while Penang and Malacca joined the new Malayan Union (a predecessor of modern-day Malaysia). Labuan was briefly annexed to Singapore, before being attached to the new colony of British North Borneo.

Population 

The following are the area and population, with details of race distribution, of the colony of the Straits Settlements, the figures being those of the census of 1901:

The population, which was 306,775 in 1871 and 423,384 in 1881, had in 1901 reached a total of 572,249. As in former years, the increase was solely due to immigration, more especially of Chinese, though a considerable number of Tamils and other natives of India settled in the Straits Settlements. The total number of births registered in the colony in 1900 was 14,814, and the ratio per 1,000 of the population during 1896, 1897, and 1898 respectively was 22–18, 20–82 and 21–57; while the number of registered deaths for the years 1896–1900 gave a ratio per 1000 of 42–21, 36–90, 30–43, 31–66 and 36-25 respectively, the number of deaths registered during 1900 being 23,385. The cause to which the excess of deaths over births is to be attributed is to be found in the fact that the Chinese and Indian population, which numbered 339,083, or over 59 per cent of the whole, was composed of 261,412 males and only 77,671 females, and a comparatively small number of the latter were married women and mothers of families. Male Europeans also outnumbered females by about two to one. Among the Malays and Eurasians, who alone had a fair proportion of both sexes, infant mortality was excessive due to early marriages and other causes.

The number of immigrants landing in the various settlements during 1906 was:
Singapore 176,587 Chinese; Penang 56,333 Chinese and 52,041 natives of India; and Malacca 598 Chinese. The total number of immigrants for 1906 was therefore 285,560, as against 39,136 emigrants, mostly Chinese returning to China. In 1867, the date of the transfer of the colony from the East India Company to the Crown, the total population was estimated at 283,384.

In 1939, the population reached 1,370,300.

Finance 

In the early nineteenth century, the most common currency used in the East Indies was the Spanish dollar, including issues both from Spain and from the new world Spanish colonies, most significantly Mexico, due to market circulation from the Spanish East Indies (Spanish Philippines). Locally issued coinages included the Kelantan and Trengganu keping, and the Penang dollar.

In 1837, the Indian rupee was made the sole official currency in the Straits Settlements, as it was administered as part of India.

However, Spanish dollars continued to circulate and 1845 saw the introduction of coinage for the Straits Settlements using a system of 100 cents = 1 Straits dollar, with the dollar equal to the Spanish dollar or Mexican peso. In 1867, the administration of the Straits Settlements was separated from India and the dollar was made the standard currency.

The revenue of the colony in 1868 amounted to $1,301,843. That for 1906 was $9,512,132, exclusive of $106,180 received for land sales. Of this sum, $6,650,558 was derived from import duties on opium, wines, and spirits, and licences to deal in these articles, $377,972 from land revenue, $592,962 from postal and telegraphic revenue, and $276,019 from port and harbour dues.

Expenditures, which in 1868 amounted to $1,197,177, rose in 1906 to $8,747,819. The total cost of the administrative establishments amounted to $4,450,791, of which $2,586,195 were personal emoluments and $1,864,596 other charges. The military expenditure (the colony paid on this account 20 per cent of its gross revenue to the British government by way of military contribution) amounted in 1906 to $1,762,438; $578,025 was expended on upkeep and maintenance of existing public works, and $1,209,291 on new roads, streets, bridges, and buildings.

See also 
 Federation of Malaya
 History of Malaysia
 History of Singapore
 Governor of the Straits Settlements
 Legislative Council of the Straits Settlements
 Postage stamps and postal history of the Straits Settlements
 Straits Settlements cricket team

References

Further reading 
 Straits Settlements Blue Book, 1906 (Singapore, 1907)
 Straits Directory, 1908 (Singapore, 1908)
 Journal of the Straits branch of the Royal Asiatic Society (Singapore)
 Sir Frederick Weld and Sir William Maxwell, severally, on the Straits Settlements in the Journal of the Royal Colonial Institute (London, 1884 and 1892)
 Henry Norman, The Far East (London, 1894)
 Alleyne Ireland, The Far Eastern Tropics (London, 1904); Sir Frank Swettenham, British Malaya (London, 1906)
 
 The Life of Sir Stamford Raffles (London, 1856, 1898)

External links 

 WorldsStatesmen Singapore, listing the chief administrators

 
British Malaya
Former British colonies and protectorates in Asia
Former countries in Malaysian history
States and federal territories of Malaysia
States and territories established in 1826
States and territories disestablished in 1946
1826 establishments in British Malaya
1946 disestablishments in British Malaya